Jesús Ricardo Angulo Uriarte (born 20 February 1997), also known as Canelo, is a Mexican professional footballer who plays as a winger for Liga MX club León.

Club career
Angulo made his Liga MX debut with Dorados de Sinaloa on 13 March 2016 against Toluca in a 3–0 loss.

With Dorados de Sinaloa descending to Ascenso MX the following season, he started playing in the starting eleven and won the Apertura tournament. On 21 January 2017, he scored his first goal with them in a 4–2 loss against Atlante. On 3 March 2017, he scored his first brace against Cimarrones de Sonora in 5–1 victory.

Signed by Tijuana, he made his debut for the team on 21 July 2018 against Guadalajara, winning 2–1.

In June 2019, he was signed by Necaxa for the 2019 Apertura. On 28 July, he debuted with Necaxa in a 2–0 loss against UNAM. On 14 September, he scored his first goal and brace with the team in a 2–0 victory over Monterrey.

On 17 December 2019, it was officially announced that Angulo was signed by Guadalajara for the 2020 Clausura. On 11 January 2020 he made his official debut for the team, coming on as a substitute at the 70th minute in a 2–0 victory over Juárez. On 12 August, he would score his first goal with Chivas in a 2–0 victory over Juárez.

On 21 November 2020, he scored Guadalajara's only goal during the reclassification phase of the Guardianes championship against Necaxa, qualifying them to the quarter-finals.

International career

Youth
Angulo was called up by Jaime Lozano to be in the preliminary roster for the 2019 Toulon Tournament but did not make the final list.

In January 2020, Angulo was called up again by Lozano to participate in a mini-camp to prepare for the 2020 CONCACAF Men's Olympic Qualifying Championship.

Angulo participated at the 2020 CONCACAF Olympic Qualifying Championship, appearing in five matches, where Mexico won the competition. He was subsequently called up to participate in the 2020 Summer Olympics. Angulo won the bronze medal with the Olympic team.

Senior
On 2 October 2019, Angulo made his senior national team debut scoring in a 2–0 victory over Trinidad and Tobago.

Career statistics

International

International goals
Scores and results list Mexico's goal tally first.

Honours
Dorados
Ascenso MX: Apertura 2016

Mexico U23
CONCACAF Olympic Qualifying Championship: 2020
Olympic Bronze Medal: 2020

References

External links
 
  
 
 

1997 births
Living people
Association football fullbacks
Mexico international footballers
Dorados de Sinaloa footballers
Club Tijuana footballers
Club Necaxa footballers
C.D. Guadalajara footballers
Liga MX players
Ascenso MX players
Tercera División de México players
Sportspeople from Culiacán
Footballers from Sinaloa
Footballers at the 2020 Summer Olympics
Olympic footballers of Mexico
Olympic medalists in football
Olympic bronze medalists for Mexico
Medalists at the 2020 Summer Olympics
Mexican footballers